Yuliana Korolkova (born 9 September 1994) is a Russian model and beauty pageant titleholder. She was first runner-up at the Miss Russia 2016 pageant and later represented Russia at the Miss Universe 2016.

Early life 
Korolkova was born and raised in Orsk in Orenburg Oblast.

Pageantry 
Korolkova began her pageantry career representing Orenburg in the Miss Russia 2016 competition, she was declared first runner-up will compete at the Miss Universe 2016 pageant which is slated to be held on 30 January 2017. Yana will represent Russia at the Miss World 2016 pageant scheduled to be held on 18 December 2016. She did not placed in the Top 13.

References

External links

1994 births
People from Orenburg
Living people
Russian beauty pageant winners
Russian female models
Miss Russia winners
Miss Universe 2016 contestants